Giovanni Luca Lucci (1637-1740) was an Italian painter of the Baroque period, active near his native Fabriano in the Region of the Marche.

He trained with Andrea Carlone for 14 years in Rome. In 1696, he painted frescoes for the tombs of the Beato Giovanni del Bastone in the church of San Benedetto in Fabriano.
His son was the painter Giovanni Ulisse Lucci (active 1717-1760s) also of Fabriano.

References

1637 births
1740 deaths
17th-century Italian painters
Italian male painters
18th-century Italian painters
18th-century Italian male artists